Tofig Shamil oghlu Safaraliyev (January 1, 1932 — July 19, 1983) was an Azerbaijani statesman, Minister of Industrial Construction of the Azerbaijan SSR (1979–1983), Deputy of the 10th convocation of the Supreme Soviet of the Azerbaijan SSR.

Biography 
Tofig Safaraliyev was born on January 1, 1932. After graduating from the Azerbaijan Industrial Institute in 1954, he worked as an engineer, department head and chief mechanic at Baku refineries. For a number of years he was chief specialist and group leader in the construction of oil refineries in Iraq and Egypt, as well as economic adviser to the USSR embassy in India. From 1962 to 1966 Tofig Safaraliyev headed the Vladimir Ilyich New Baku Oil Refinery.

In 1974, Tofig Safaraliyev was appointed Deputy Minister of Oil Refining and Petrochemical Industry of the Azerbaijan SSR, in 1975 he became the First Deputy Minister of Industrial Construction, and in 1979 he became the Minister of Industrial Construction of the Azerbaijan SSR.

Tofig Safaraliyev was elected a member of the Soviet Communist Party in 1956 and was a deputy of the 10th convocation of the Supreme Soviet of the Azerbaijan SSR. He was elected a member of the Central Committee at the XXX Congress of the Communist Party of Azerbaijan. He was awarded the Order of Lenin and the Badge of Honor, as well as three USSR medals. He was awarded the honorary title of "Honored Engineer of the Azerbaijan SSR".

Tofig Safaraliyev died on July 19, 1983. He was buried in the Alley of Honor on July 21.

References

External links 

 

1932 births
1983 deaths
Burials at Alley of Honor
Azerbaijan Communist Party (1920) politicians
Azerbaijan State Oil and Industry University alumni
Recipients of the Order of Lenin